Interface Builder is a software development application for Apple's macOS operating system. It is part of Xcode (formerly Project Builder), the Apple Developer developer's toolset. Interface Builder allows Cocoa and Carbon developers to create interfaces for applications using a graphical user interface. The resulting interface is stored as a .nib file, short for NeXT Interface Builder, or more recently, as an XML-based .xib file.

Interface Builder is descended from the NeXTSTEP development software of the same name. A version of Interface Builder is also used in the development of OpenStep software, and a very similar tool called Gorm exists for GNUstep. On March 27, 2008, a specialized iPhone version of Interface Builder allowing interface construction for iPhone applications was released with the iPhone SDK Beta 2. 

Interface Builder was intentionally developed as a separate application, to allow interaction designers to design interfaces without having to use a code-oriented IDE, but as of Xcode 4, Apple has integrated its functionality directly into Xcode.

History 

Interface Builder first made its appearance in 1986 written in Lisp (for the ExperLisp product by ExperTelligence).  It was invented and developed by Jean-Marie Hullot using the object-oriented features in ExperLisp, and deeply integrated with the Macintosh toolbox. Denison Bollay took Jean-Marie Hullot to NeXT later that year to demonstrate it to Steve Jobs.  Jobs immediately recognized its value, and started incorporating it into NeXTSTEP, and by 1988 it was part of NeXTSTEP 0.8. It was the first commercial application that allowed interface objects, such as buttons, menus, and windows, to be placed in an interface using a mouse. One notable early use of Interface Builder was the development of the first WorldWideWeb web browser by Tim Berners-Lee at CERN, made using a NeXT workstation.

Design 

Interface Builder provides palettes, or collections, of user interface objects to an Objective-C or Swift developer. These user interface objects contain items like text fields, data tables, sliders, and pop-up menus. Interface Builder's palettes are completely extensible, meaning any developer can develop new objects and add palettes to Interface Builder.

To build an interface, a developer simply drags interface objects from the palette onto a window or menu. Actions (messages) which the objects can emit are connected to targets in the application's code and outlets (pointers) declared in the application's code are connected to specific objects. In this way all initialization is done before runtime, both improving performance and streamlining the development process. When Interface Builder was a standalone application, interface designers could ship nib files to developers, who would then drop them into their projects.

Interface Builder saves an application's interface as a bundle that contains the interface objects and relationships used in the application. These objects are archived (a process also known as serialization or  marshalling in other contexts) into either an XML file or a NeXT-style property list file with a  extension. Upon running an application, the proper NIB objects are unarchived, connected into the binary of their owning application, and awakened. Unlike almost all other GUI designer systems which generate code to construct the UI (notable exceptions being Glade, Embarcadero Technologies's Delphi and C++Builder, which stream UI objects similarly), NIBs are often referred to as freeze dried because they contain the archived objects themselves, ready to run. As of Interface Builder version 3, a new file format (with extension .xib) has been added, which is functionally identical to .nib, except it is stored in a flat file, making it more suitable for storage in revision control systems and processing by tools such as diff.

External links 
 Apple's Interface Builder description for Cocoa and Carbon development
 Sun's Interface Builder documentation for OpenStep development (Archive.org)
 Apple's Nib file documentation
 Action!, the worlds [sic] first dynamic interface builder - 1988

MacOS programming tools
NeXT
User interface builders